DD Free Dish (previously known as DD Direct Plus) is an Indian free-to-air satellite television provider. DD Free Dish DTH service is owned and operated by Public Service Broadcaster Prasar Bharati. It was launched in December, 2004. In March 2022, It has a reach of over 43 million households which is more than 25% of the total TV households in the country. DD Free Dish earns by selling slots to private broadcasters through e-auctions.

Currently, DD Free Dish has 116 television channels, among which 94 channels are in MPEG-2 format and 22 channels in MPEG-4 format. For classes 1 to 12, educational TV channels are run under PM e-Vidya program.

Television channels

Doordarshan
TV channels owned by Prasar Bharati -

National
 DD Bharati – State-owned art and cultural infotainment channel 
 DD India – State-owned international channel 
 DD Kisan – Agriculture education and information channel
 DD National – General entertainment channel 
 DD News – News channel
 DD Retro – Doordarshan's channel for re-run of its popular classic shows 
 DD Sports – Sports channel
 DD Urdu – State-owned Urdu-language infotainment channel (available in MPEG-4 format) 
 DD Free Dish Home Channel – Provides information about DD Free Dish

Additionally, DD Free Dish has one HD channel in MPEG-4 format –

 DD National HD – HD version of DD National

Parliamentary
 Sansad TV – 2 channels of the same name with same content feed, except when the proceedings of the parliament is in place, for which separate feeds are aired.

Regional channels (MPEG-2)

Regional channels (MPEG-4)

Private channels (MPEG-2)

Hindi general entertainment

 Abzy Cool
 Big Magic

 Dangal
 Dangal 2
 Enterr10
 Ishara TV
 Shemaroo TV
 Shemaroo Umang

 The Q

Sports
 Sports18 Khel

Hindi Music
 9XM
 B4U Music
 Mastiii
 MTV Beats
 ShowBox
 Zing

Hindi-language movies
 B4U Kadak
 B4U Movies
 Colors Cineplex Bollywood
 Colors Cineplex Superhits
 Dhamaka Movies B4U
 Dhinchaak 2
 Goldmines
 Goldmines Bollywood
 Manoranjan TV
 Movie Plus
 Sony Wah
 Star Utsav Movies
 Zee Anmol Cinema

Hindi-language news
 Aaj Tak
 ABP News
 Good News Today
 India News
 India TV
 NDTV India
 News 24
 News Nation
 News18 India
 Republic Bharat
 Times Now Navbharat
 TV9 Bharatvarsh
 Zee Hindustan 
 Zee News

Devotional channels
 Aastha
 Sanskar
 Vedic

Bhojpuri
 B4U Bhojpuri – Movies
 Bhojpuri Cinema – Movies
 Filamchi Bhojpuri – Movies
 Goldmines Bhojpuri – Movies
 Manoranjan Grand – Kids
 Manoranjan Prime – Movies
 Zee Biskope – Movies
 Zee Ganga – GEC

Marathi
 Fakt Marathi – GEC
 Shemaroo Marathibana – Movies
 Sun Marathi – GEC
 Zee Chitramandir – Movies

Punjabi
 Manoranjan Movies – Movies
 Popcorn Movies – Movies, Music and Hindi Devotional content
 Zee Punjabi – GEC

Private channels (MPEG-4)
 Aastha Bhajan – Hindi, devotional
 BTV World – Bangladeshi channel
 Chardikla Time TV – Punjabi, news and entertainment
 India News UP/UK – Hindi, regional news
 KBS World – Korean channel
 Russia Today – English, news
 Good News Today – Hindi, regional news
 News18 UP/UK – Hindi, regional news
 Swaraj Express SMBC– Hindi, news
 Samay – Hindi, news
 Sudarshan News – Hindi, news
 Swadesh News – Hindi, news

Radio Station

National
 Vividh Bharati – Hindi music radio channel
 AIR News – Hindi and English news radio
 AIR Urdu – Urdu entertainment and information radio channel
 AIR Raagam – Indian classical music radio channel
 Gyan Vani – Hindi and English educational channel

Regional
 AIR Assamese
 AIR Bangla
 AIR Gujarati
 AIR Hindi
 AIR Kannada
 AIR Malayalam
 AIR Marathi
 AIR Oriya
 AIR Punjabi
 AIR Tamil
 AIR Telugu
 AIR Agartala – Bengali and Kokborok
 AIR Aizawl – Mizo
 AIR Bhopal – Hindi
 AIR Dehradun – Hindi
 AIR Gangtok – Nepali
 AIR Imphal – Manipuri
 AIR Itanagar – Hindi and Nyishi
 AIR Jaipur – Hindi and Rajasthani
 AIR Jammu – Dogri
 AIR Kohima – Nagamese and English
 AIR Leh – Ladakhi and French
 AIR Lucknow – Hindi
 AIR North East – Hindi and English
 AIR Panjim – Konkani
 AIR Patna – Hindi and Bhojpuri
 AIR Port Blair – Hindi
 AIR Puducherry – Tamil
 AIR Raipur – Hindi and Chhattisgarhi
 AIR Ranchi – Hindi
 AIR Rohtak – Hindi and Haryanvi
 AIR Shillong – Khasi, Garo and English
 AIR Shimla – Hindi
 AIR Srinagar – Kashmiri and Urdu
 AIR Vijayawada – Telugu

MPEG-4 radio
 FM Gold Delhi
 FM Rainbow Delhi
 AIR Darbhanga
 AIR Nazibabad
 AIR World Service 1
 AIR World Service 2
 AIR N'hood Service 1
 AIR N'hood Service 2

Other channels

e-Vidya Channels
There are 12 educational channels, one for each class from Class 1 to Class 12.

 e-Vidya 1 – For Class 1 students
 e-Vidya 2 – For Class 2 students
 e-Vidya 3 – For Class 3 students
 e-Vidya 4 – For Class 4 students
 e-Vidya 5 – For Class 5 students
 e-Vidya 6 – For Class 6 students
 e-Vidya 7 – For Class 7 students
 e-Vidya 8 – For Class 8 students
 e-Vidya 9 – For Class 9 students
 e-Vidya 10 – For Class 10 students
 e-Vidya 11 – For Class 11 students
 e-Vidya 12 – For Class 12 students

Swayam Prabha DTH
 SP-01 CEC-UGC : Vageesh - language and literature
 SP-02 CEC-UGC : Sanskriti - history, culture and philosophy
 SP-03 CEC-UGC : Prabodh - social and behaviour sciences
 SP-04 CEC-UGC : Saaraswat - education and home sciences
 SP-05 CEC-UGC : Prabandhan - information, communication and management studies
 SP-06 CEC-UGC : Vidhik - law and legal studies
 SP-07 CEC-UGC : Kautilya - economics and commerce
 SP-08 CEC-UGC : Aryabhatt - physical and earth sciences
 SP-09 CEC-UGC : Spandan - life sciences
 SP-10 CEC-UGC : Daksh - applied sciences
 SP-11 NPTEL : Chemical Engineering
 SP-12 NPTEL : Civil Engineering
 SP-13 NPTEL : Computer Science Engineering
 SP-14 NPTEL : Electrical Engineering and Electronics Communication Engineering
 SP-15 NPTEL : Engineering Sciences and Biological Sciences
 SP-16 NPTEL : Humanities, Social Sciences and Management
 SP-17 NPTEL : Mechanical Engineering and Mining Engineering
 SP-18 NPTEL : Mathematics and Physics
 SP-19 IIT-PAL : Biology
 SP-20 IIT-PAL : Chemistry
 SP-21 IIT-PAL : Mathematics
 SP-22 IIT-PAL : Physics
 SP-23 IGNOU : Liberal Arts and Humanities
 SP-24 IGNOU : Agriculture and Allied Sciences
 SP-25 IGNOU : Gyan Darshan 1
 SP-26 IGNOU : State Open Universities
 SP-27 NIOS : Panini - Secondary School Education
 SP-28 NIOS : Sharda - Higher Secondary School Education
 SP-29 UGC-INFLIBNET : e-PG Pathshala - Post Graduate Courses
 SP-30 NIOS : Gyanamrit - Education in Sign Language
 SP-31 NCERT : Kishore Manch - Secondary School, Higher Secondary School and Teacher Education
 SP-32 IGNOU-NIOS : Vagda - Teacher Education
 SP-33 CEC-UGC : Vyas - Higher Education Channel
 Digi Shala - Digital Education Channel

VANDE Gujarat
 VANDE Gujarat 1
 VANDE Gujarat 2
 VANDE Gujarat 3
 VANDE Gujarat 4
 VANDE Gujarat 5
 VANDE Gujarat 6
 VANDE Gujarat 7
 VANDE Gujarat 8
 VANDE Gujarat 9
 VANDE Gujarat 10
 VANDE Gujarat 11
 VANDE Gujarat 12
 VANDE Gujarat 13
 VANDE Gujarat 14
 VANDE Gujarat 15
 VANDE Gujarat 16
 Digi Shala

See also 
 Direct-to-home television in India

References

External links
Official website
GSAT 15 at Lyngsat

2004 establishments in Delhi
Companies based in Delhi
Direct broadcast satellite services
Doordarshan
Free-to-air
Television networks in India